Luis Santamaría Crisanto Figueroa (born 22 November 1975 in Iriona, Colón, Honduras) is a Honduran footballer who plays for Liga Nacional de Honduras club Atlético Choloma as a defender.

Club career
A big, lanky defender, Santamaría started his career at Marathón and also played for other Honduran giants Real España and F.C. Motagua. In 2007, he signed a contract with Chinese club Beijing Guoan. He also had a spell with Qingdao Zhongneng in 2008.

In summer 2011 Santamaría joined Necaxa and in summer 2012 he moved to Atlético Choloma.

International career
Santamaría made his debut for Honduras in a November 2000 FIFA World Cup qualification match against Saint Vincent & the Grenadines and has earned a total of 2 caps, scoring 1 goal. He was a non-playing squad member at the 2007 CONCACAF Gold Cup.

His second and final international was a May 2007 friendly match against Venezuela.

International goals

References

External links

 Profile - C.D. Marathón

1975 births
Living people
People from Colón Department (Honduras)
Association football defenders
Honduran footballers
Honduras international footballers
2007 CONCACAF Gold Cup players
C.D. Marathón players
Independiente Villela players
Real C.D. España players
F.C. Motagua players
Qingdao Hainiu F.C. (1990) players
C.D.S. Vida players
Atlético Choloma players
Honduran expatriate footballers
Expatriate footballers in China
Liga Nacional de Fútbol Profesional de Honduras players